Morella is an ancient  walled city located on a hill-top in the province of Castellón, Valencian Community, Spain. The town is the capital and administrative centre of the comarca of Els Ports, in the historic Maestrat (Maestrazgo) region.

There are traces of settlement by the Iberians, succeeded by the Greeks and Romans, Visigoths and the Moors. From the early 17th century to the Spanish Civil War, the town was often fought over, due to its strategic situation between the Ebro and the coastal plain of Valencia. Morella is part of the Taula del Sénia free association of municipalities.

Every six years the citizens celebrate the Sexenni, a commemoration of the town's recovery from the plague in the seventeenth century.  Tourism now plays an important part in the local economy, along with agriculture. In the 20th century the town and surrounding area became depopulated, a trend that has only been reversed in the early 21st century. The population of Morella at the start of 2019 was 2,430, having declined from a figure of 7,335 in 1900 (INE).

One of the typical gastronomic products of Morella is sweets known as flaons. Local bakeries are also renowned for a number of other traditional pastries and sweets, like mantecadas, prepared in the ancient way.

History

These paintings date from 7,200 to 7,400 years ago.

The ancient Greeks established a treasury at Morella, but then the area became the scene of conflict between the Carthaginians and the Roman Empire during the Punic Wars. Eventually the town was Romanized and became part of the province of Tarragona.  The Visigoths populated the city in two different epochs, there are ruins of a Visigoth village in  the site of  Mas Sabater-Cantera de la Parreta de Morella. There are the remains of a building from the 7th century A.D., which according to the archaeologists could have been twelve meters high and maybe it was a noble building or maybe of religious use according to Ramiro Pérez, one of the directors of the excavation.

The Moors took the town in 714, naming it Maurela.

El Cid is reputed to have rebuilt the castle which dominates the town and in 1084 he is supposed to have fought in the service of Yusuf al-Mu'taman ibn Hud and defeated Sancho Ramírez of Aragon at the Battle of Morella. In 1117, Sancho captured Morella, but it was recaptured by the Moors and only finally subdued by Blasco de Alagon in 1232. Following Blasco's death in 1239, James I of Aragon established a royal garrison in the city and awarded the inhabitants the title of "Faithful".

Morella sided with Philip V during the War of the Spanish Succession in the early eighteenth century and became the centre of a military and political district. During the Napoleonic Wars, the citizens rose up against the invading forces and the town was finally captured for Spain in 1813 by Francisco Javier de Elío. In the Carlist Wars of the nineteenth century Morella became the headquarters of the forces of Ramon Cabrera.

The town was captured by forces of General Franco in April 1938, towards the end of the Spanish Civil War. Republican guerillas held out in the surrounding mountains until 1956.

In the 1960s and 70s many people left the town for work opportunities in the cities and many of the local small industries died, but a slow revitalization has taken place since the transition of Spain to democracy.

Sexenni

In the late seventeenth century, Morella was severely affected by the plague. It is said that the plague disappeared from the city and, to remember this, every six years the Sexenni festival takes place for nine days in late August. The virgin is carried in procession and the traditional town guilds perform ancient dances in her honour. The festivities in 2006 were the first of the 21st century.

Municipal area

Morella's municipal area is divided into subdivisions known since ancient times as Dena.
These are: La Vespa, Els Castellons, Dena Primera del Riu, Dena Segona del Riu, La Font d'en Torres, Herbeset, Els Llivis, Morella la Vella, El Coll i el Moll, La Pobla d'Alcolea, Dena de la Roca, Muixacre, Herbeset, Xiva de Morella, Hortells and Vallivana.

Geography
Morella occupies a strategic position between the plains of the river Ebro to the north west and the coastal plains of Valencia and Castellon. Access from the north west lies through the passes of Torre Miró  and Querol . The river Bergantes skirts the southern boundaries of the town as it descends towards the Guadalope which ultimately joins the Ebro.

Climate

The annual sunshine hours are around 2500−2600.

Today
Morella is now a tourist destination, with many historic buildings, hotels and restaurants. It is listed as one of the most beautiful towns in Spain. Some of the top sights to see in Morella are the Castillo de Morella (Morella Castle), the aqueduct, Iglesia de Santa María  (Saint Mary’s Church), Convent de San Francesc (St. Francis’ Convent) both in Gothic style, the Temps de Dinosaures Museum (Time of Dinosaurs Museum), and the Visigoth settlement from the 7th century (Mas Sabater-Cantera la Parreta).

Although not as important as in the past, wool and woollen goods still plays a part in the local economy. One of its most famous products is the Morella blanket, which has a unique design, with a range of colour combinations and horizontal stripes. Agriculture, especially poultry and pig production are important in the surrounding area with craft products and highly valued black truffles which are traded at seasonal markets during the winter.

Notable people
 

Antonio Royo Marín (1913-April 2005), Spanish Dominican priest and theologian

Gallery

See also
Ports (comarca)
Ports de Morella
Maestrat
Vallivana

References

External links

 Web oficial de l'ajuntament de Morella
 Paco González Ramírez, País Valencià, poble a poble, comarca a comarca
 Institut Valencià d'Estadística.
 Portal de la Direcció General d'Administració Local de la Generalitat.

Municipalities in the Province of Castellón
Ports (comarca)